Pleasant Township is one of twelve townships in Steuben County, Indiana, United States. As of the 2010 census, its population was 13,704 and it contained 6,967 housing units.

History
Fox Lake and Pokagon State Park are listed on the National Register of Historic Places.

Geography
Lakes in this township include Booth Lake, Buck Lake, Center Lake, Cheeseboro Lake, Crockett Lake, Crooked Lake, First Basin of Lake James (a.k.a. Lower Basin of Lake James), Fox Lake, Johnson Lake, Lake Charles East, Little Center Lake, Loon Lake, Middle Center Lake, Mud Lake, Second Basin of Lake James (a.k.a. Middle Basin of Lake James), and Silver Lake.

Cities and towns
 Angola (the county seat)

Unincorporated towns
 Crooked Lake
 Glen Eden
(This list is based on USGS data and may include former settlements.)

Adjacent townships
 Jamestown Township (north)
 Fremont Township (northeast)
 Scott Township (east)
 Otsego Township (southeast)
 Steuben Township (south)
 Salem Township (southwest)
 Jackson Township (west)
 Millgrove Township (northwest)

Cemeteries
The township contains four cemeteries: Circle Hill, Crockett, Old Circle Hill and Sowles.

Major highways
  Interstate 69
  U.S. Route 20
  State Road 127
  State Road 827

Education
Pleasant Township residents may obtain a free library card from the Carnegie Public Library of Steuben County.

References
 U.S. Board on Geographic Names (GNIS)
 United States Census Bureau cartographic boundary files

External links
 Indiana Township Association
 United Township Association of Indiana

Townships in Steuben County, Indiana
Townships in Indiana